This is a compilation list, by country, of canals used mainly for navigation. Historically, canals are human-made structures, built for water control, flood prevention, irrigation, and water transport. Their exact design varies depending upon the local importance of each function. This is still the case today, and new canals generally serve multiple functions. Instead of the formal expression 'inland waterways’, the vernacular term 'canal' is often used to describe both human-made canals and river navigations, whether free-flowing waterways, or those with locks and dams or weirs.

List of lists
 List of canals in Belgium
 List of canals in Canada
 History of canals in China
 List of canals in France
 List of canals in Germany
 List of canals in India
 Canals in Italy (category)
 List of Roman canals
 List of canals in Ireland
 Canals in the Netherlands (category)
 Canals of Amsterdam
 Canals in Norway (category)
Canals in Pakistan (category)
 List of canals in Russia
 Canals in Sweden (category)
 List of canals in Switzerland
 List of canals of the United Kingdom
 List of canal tunnels in the United Kingdom
 List of canals in the United States
 List of canals in Massachusetts
 List of canals in New York
 List of canals in Oregon
 List of canals in Texas

Categories of Canals

List of canals
Chile
Bío-Bío Canal
Dubai
 Dubai Water Canal
Egypt
Suez Canal
Finland
 Saimaa Canal
Greece
Corinthian Canal connected the Gulf of Corinth with the Aegean Sea,
Pakistan
Kachhi Canal
Panama
 Panama Canal
Poland
Augustów Canal
Bydgoszcz Canal
Elbląg Canal
Danube-Oder-Canal
Romania
Danube-Black Sea Canal
Danube–Bucharest Canal
Serbia
Great Bačka Canal
Little Bačka Canal
Danube–Tisa–Danube Canal
Spain
Canal de Castilla
Canal del Duero
Canal de Isabel II
Canal Imperial de Aragón
Turkmenistan
Qaraqum Canal
Vietnam
Vĩnh Tế Canal

See also

 List of Martian canals
 Lists of canals

List